Sven Selka (born 23 February 1996), known by his alias INHUMAN (stylised in all caps), formerly Code:Pandorum and Static:Reset, is a German musician, record producer, and salesman. He is credited with being one of the pioneers of "deathstep" music and the incorporation of orchestral music into dubstep. He has also done numerous remixes for other artists such as Riot Ten, Modestep, and Apashe.

Early life 
Selka first began music production in 5th grade, when a friend introduced him to FL Studio, and first began electronic music and heavy metal music, but when he discovered dubstep when he was 14, he started to take influence from the style. He was inspired by artists such as Borgore, Bratkilla, Mantis, and Sadhu.

Music career 
Later, he began producing in the early deathstep music scene under the name Static:Reset, his first official release was in 2013, an EP titled Profanity. Then, in 2014, he changed his name to Code:Pandorum with the release of the Tears of Kali EP. In 2016, he released his debut album, God LP and a later reissue called God's Army. In 2021, he changed his name from Code:Pandorum to Inhuman with a single called "Rapture". Inhuman has also been the founder and CEO of independent label Crowsnest Audio, co-founded with Lord Swan3x and TenGraphs. Crowsnest Audio was founded on 2016 in Germany.

Musical style 
While his music is typically referred to as "deathstep" and he is affiliated with the deathstep music circle, Selka has stated he would not describe his music as "deathstep" due to the prevalence of melodic dubstep throughout his music, and has transitioned into more melodic dubstep after changing from Code:Pandorum to INHUMAN. His musical style is described as dark dubstep with orchestral elements such as sampling of church choir and classical music to create pre-bass drop tension. He has states that his music is akin to a horror film, and his music stages resemble plot stages: he creates a dark atmosphere (exposition), then the bass drop approaches, (building tension), and then the bass drop initiates (climax).

Influence 
INHUMAN has been a large influence on dubstep music and inspired deathstep artists such as TenGraphs, Lord Swan3x, and FaceSplit. In the early 2010s, deathstep's origin, it was an underground dubstep subgenre, but INHUMAN popularised deathstep styles into mainstream with his albums.

Naming 
From 2014 to 2021, INHUMAN's alias was Code:Pandorum, a name inspired by the film of the same name, and the colon stylisation was from INHUMAN's 2013 to 2014 alias Static:Reset (on advice from fellow musician Bratkilla). There is no known meaning for the names Static:Reset or INHUMAN.

Discography 

INHUMAN (formerly Static:Reset and Code:Pandorum) is a German DJ that has made 8 total albums, 10 EPs, 20 singles, 6 music videos, and 25 remixes.

EPs

Released as Static:Reset 

 Profanity (2013)
 Warriors (2013)

Released as Code:Pandorum 

 Tears of Kali (2014)
 The Order (2014)
 Lunatic (2015)
 Chosen (2016)
 Inquisition (2016)
 Outclass (2018)
 Penumbra (2019)
 Road to AOTD (2020)
 Brotherhood (2020)

Released as INHUMAN 

 DAMNATION_TAPES, VOL 1 (2022)
 COLLISION I (2022)
 BLACK_MASS (2022)

LPs

Released as Code:Pandorum 

 GOD LP (2016)
 The Lovecraftian Horrors (2017)
 Videodrome (2018)
 Art Of The Devil (2020)

Studio albums 

All studio albums are released under the former name Code:Pandorum.

 GOD LP (2016)
 The Lovecraftian Horrors (2017)
 Videodrome (2018)
 Art of the Devil (2020)

Compilation albums 
All compilation albums are released under the name Code:Pandorum, on behalf the Crowsnest Audio record label (owned and founded by INHUMAN).

 Kill List (2016)
 Crowsnest Elite #1 (2017)
 Leviathan Ch. 1 (2019)
 Crowsnest Elite #2 (2019)
 Leviathan Ch. 2 (2020)
 Crowsnest Elite #3 (2020)
 Crowsnest Elite #4 (2021)

Singles

Released as Code:Pandorum 

 "The Neon Demon" (2017)
 "Run It" (2018)
 "The Devils" (2019)
 "Sweet Dreams" (featuring SnoWhite) (2019)
 "Art of the Devil" (2020)
 "Purpose" (2020)
 "Fade to Black" (featuring Vulgatron) (2020)
 "Streets of Rage" (featuring Kid Bookie) (2020)
 "Eclipse" (featuring SnoWhite) (2020)
 "Utopia" (featuring FaceSplit) (2020)
 "High Tension" (featuring Twisted Insane) (2020)
 "Sadako" (2020)
 "Overlord" (featuring Axen) (2020)
 "Everyone's the Same" (featuring Qoiet) (2020)
 "Burn" (featuring Mantis) (2020)
 "Colossus" (featuring FaceSplit and Adrift) (2020)
 "The Executioner" (featuring Vulgatron) (2021)

Released as INHUMAN 

 "Rapture" (featuring OMAS, Les Gold, and SnoWhite) (2021)
 "Vagabond" (2021)
 "Quicksand" (featuring The Anix) (2021)
 "Cycles" (2021)

Music videos 

All music videos have been released under the Code:Pandorum name.

 Art of the Devil (2020)
 Purpose (2020)
 Fade to Black (featuring Vulgatron) (2020)
 Eclipse (featuring SnoWhite) (2020)
 Existence (2020)
 The Executioner (featuring Vulgatron) (2021)

References

German male musicians
Living people
1996 births